Chalderaz or Chal Deraz or Chal-e Deraz may refer to:
 Chalderaz-e Beytollah
 Chalderaz-e Esfandiyar
 Chalderaz-e Gholamali
 Chalderaz-e Hadi
 Chalderaz-e Yadollah